Taipa is a settlement on the southern side of Doubtless Bay in Northland, New Zealand.  runs through it. It is the westernmost of the Taipa-Mangonui string of settlements, and separated from the others by the Taipa River.

Taipa is traditionally the first landing place of Kupe, the Polynesian explorer of Aotearoa. There is a memorial near the bridge over the Taipa River.

The name may have originated as Taiapa, a fence between two disputed shellfish beds.

Demographics
Statistics New Zealand describes Taipa as a rural settlement. Taipa is part of the larger Taumarumaru statistical area.

Taipa had a population of 159 at the 2018 New Zealand census, an increase of 24 people (17.8%) since the 2013 census, and an increase of 33 people (26.2%) since the 2006 census. There were 60 households, comprising 75 males and 84 females, giving a sex ratio of 0.89 males per female. The median age was 49.6 years (compared with 37.4 years nationally), with 27 people (17.0%) aged under 15 years, 18 (11.3%) aged 15 to 29, 69 (43.4%) aged 30 to 64, and 42 (26.4%) aged 65 or older.

Ethnicities were 75.5% European/Pākehā, 35.8% Māori, 3.8% Pacific peoples, 1.9% Asian, and 0.0% other ethnicities. People may identify with more than one ethnicity.

Of those people who chose to answer the census's question about religious affiliation, 49.1% had no religion, 39.6% were Christian, 3.8% had Māori religious beliefs and 1.9% were Buddhist.

Of those at least 15 years old, 24 (18.2%) people had a bachelor or higher degree, and 27 (20.5%) people had no formal qualifications. The median income was $23,700, compared with $31,800 nationally. 9 people (6.8%) earned over $70,000 compared to 17.2% nationally. The employment status of those at least 15 was that 48 (36.4%) people were employed full-time, 27 (20.5%) were part-time, and 3 (2.3%) were unemployed.

Education
Taipa Area School is a coeducational composite (years 1-15) school with a roll of  students as of  The school opened as Taipa District High School in 1956, and became an area school in 1976.

A school existed at Taipa in 1883 and was eventually replaced by the District High School.

Notes

Far North District
Populated places in the Northland Region